The Unicorn Frappuccino was a viral drink created by Starbucks, introduced in April 2017. It is made with ice, milk, pink powder, sour blue powder, crème Frappuccino syrup, mango syrup, and blue drizzle. In the 24-oz. size, it contains 500 calories, 18 grams of fat, 76 grams of sugar, and 55 milligrams of cholesterol. The drink was available only for a limited time, ending on April 25, 2017.

The Unicorn Frappuccino was criticized by the Stratford Health Department for having too much sugar. This was due to the fact that the American Heart Association recommends that women consume  of sugar every day, and that men consume  of sugar every day.

Some saw the "vibrantly hued, flavor-shifting, color-changing" drink as part of a larger, social media-fueled embrace of the unicorn in 2017.

See also

 Unicorn food

References

2010s fads and trends
Frozen drinks
Products introduced in 2017
Starbucks
Works about unicorns